The 2019–20 season was the 29th consecutive season in the top Ukrainian football league for Dynamo Kyiv. Dynamo competed in Premier League, Ukrainian Cup, UEFA Champions League and 2019 Ukrainian Super Cup.

Players

Squad information

Transfers

In

Out

Pre-season and friendlies

Competitions

Overall

Ukrainian Premier League

League table

Results summary

Results by round

Matches

Ukrainian Cup

Ukrainian Super Cup

UEFA Champions League

Third qualifying round

UEFA Europa League

Group stage

Statistics

Appearances and goals

|-
! colspan=16 style=background:#dcdcdc; text-align:center| Goalkeepers

|-
! colspan=16 style=background:#dcdcdc; text-align:center| Defenders

|-
! colspan=16 style=background:#dcdcdc; text-align:center| Midfielders

|-
! colspan=16 style=background:#dcdcdc; text-align:center| Forwards

|-
! colspan=16 style=background:#dcdcdc; text-align:center| Players transferred out during the season

Last updated: 19 July 2020

Goalscorers

Last updated: 19 July 2020

Clean sheets

Last updated: 19 July 2020

Disciplinary record

Last updated: 19 July 2020

Attendances

Last updated: 19 July 2020

References

External links
Official website

Dynamo Kyiv
FC Dynamo Kyiv seasons
Dynamo Kyiv